William Humble Ward, 10th Baron Ward (1781 – December 6, 1835) was a clergyman who succeeded to the Dudley Barony.

He was the son of Humble and Susannah Ward.

He was the father of William Ward, 1st Earl of Dudley.

References

1781 births
1835 deaths
19th-century English clergy
Place of birth missing
Barons in the Peerage of England
William Humble